Nocardioides marinquilinus is a Gram-positive, strictly aerobic, non-spore-forming, short rod-shaped and non-motile bacterium from the genus Nocardioides which has been isolated from coastal seawater in Korea.

References

External links
Type strain of Nocardioides marinquilinus at BacDive -  the Bacterial Diversity Metadatabase

marinquilinus
Bacteria described in 2013